John Yate Robinson MC (6 August 1885 – 23 August 1916) was a field hockey player, who won a gold medal with the English team at the 1908 Summer Olympics in London.

Son of clergyman the Reverend Edward Cecil Robinson and his wife Edith Isabella, he was educated at Radley College and Merton College, Oxford, where he was awarded his MA in 1912. He was on the Oxford University hockey team from 1905 through 1909, eventually captaining it.

He became a captain in the North Staffordshire Regiment in 1914, and served at Gallipoli and in Mesopotamia. He was mentioned in despatches and awarded the Military Cross.

He died aged 31 at Roehampton, from wounds he had received in action at El Hannah in Mesopotamia. He was buried at Great Malvern Cemetery, Worcestershire.

See also
 List of Olympians killed in World War I

References

External links

Notes
Radley College Register 1847–1962, 1965.

1885 births
1916 deaths
British military personnel killed in World War I
Recipients of the Military Cross
North Staffordshire Regiment officers
English male field hockey players
English Olympic medallists
Field hockey players at the 1908 Summer Olympics
Olympic gold medallists for Great Britain
Olympic field hockey players of Great Britain
British male field hockey players
People educated at Radley College
Alumni of Merton College, Oxford
British Army personnel of World War I
Olympic medalists in field hockey
Medalists at the 1908 Summer Olympics